The 2022–23 Maltese FA Trophy, officially named IZIBET FA Trophy due to sponsorship reasons, is the 85th edition of the football cup competition, the FA Trophy. The winners of the Maltese FA Trophy will earn a place in the first qualifying round of the 2023–24 UEFA Europa Conference League. The first round of games started on 15 November 2022.

Floriana were the defending champions. But were eliminated in the Round of 32 by Santa Lucia.

Preliminary round 
Twelve preliminary round matches played on 15-22 November 2022. The draw for the preliminary round was held on 26 October 2022.

Round Of 32 
Sixteen Matches were played on 13-15 January. The draw for the Round Of 32 and Round of 16 was held on 4 January 2023. The draws were held by Malta FA Director of Football Operations Stephen Azzopardi together with former Malta national team player Michael Mifsud and Franco Degabriele Chief Commercial Officer of IZIBET.
The Round Of 32 featured all 14 clubs across the Premier League, who entered the competition in this round.

Round Of 16 
Eight Matches were played on 7, 8, and 15 February. The draw for the Round Of 32 and Round of 16 was held on 4 January 2023. The draws were held by Malta FA Director of Football Operations Stephen Azzopardi together with former Malta national team player Michael Mifsud and Franco Degabriele Chief Commercial Officer of IZIBET. The round includes at least two teams from the Maltese Challenge League San Ġwann and Swieqi United, and two clubs representing from Gozo Football League are Kerċem Ajax and Qala Saints. On 8 and 9 February the Malta Football Association Postponed six matches because of bad weather in Malta, and they played on 15 February.

Quarter-finals
The matches will be played on 24-25 February 2023. The draw for the Quarter-final was held on 17 February 2023. The draws were held by former Malta international defender Brian Said and Franco Degabriele from Izibet in the presence of Malta FA Director Football Operations Stephen Azzopardi. The round includes one team from the second tier, the lowest-ranked team remaining in the competition: San Ġwann.

Semi-finals
The matches will be played on 25 and 26 April 2023. In the Semi-finals, there are 4 clubs left. All from Maltese Premier League.

Final
The match will be played on 30 April 2023.

Top scorers

Television rights
The following matches were broadcast live on TVMSports+:

References 

Malta
2021–22
Cup